Ali Aqai-ye Bala-ye Bani Chenur (also Romanized as ‘Alī Āqā'ī-ye Bālā-ye Bānī Chenūr; also known as ‘Alī Āqā'ī-ye Bālā) is a village in Ozgoleh Rural District, Ozgoleh District, Salas-e Babajani County, Kermanshah Province, Iran. At the 2006 census, its population was 37, in 9 families.

References 

Populated places in Salas-e Babajani County